Thomas Monroe may refer to:
 Thomas Bell Monroe (1791–1865), American federal judge
 Thomas Monroe (American football), American football player
 Thomas Monroe (writer) (1902–1960), American screenwriter

See also
Tom Monroe (disambiguation)